The Arsenal Stadium Mystery is a 1939  British mystery film and one of the first feature films wherein football is a central element in the plot. The film was directed by Thorold Dickinson, and shot at Denham Film Studios and on location at the original Arsenal Stadium in Highbury. It was written by Dickinson, Donald Bull, and Alan Hyman, adapted from a 1939 novel by Leonard Gribble.

Plot
The film is a murder mystery set, as the title suggests, at the original Arsenal Stadium, Gillespie Road, Highbury, London, the then home of Arsenal Football Club, who were at the time one of the dominant teams in English football. The backdrop is a friendly match between Arsenal and The Trojans, a fictitious amateur side. One of the Trojans' players drops dead during the match and when it is revealed he has been poisoned, suspicion falls on his teammates as well as his former mistress. Detective Inspector Slade (Leslie Banks) is called in to solve the crime.

The victim has been poisoned by a powerful digitalis-based chemical. There is evidence that he was being blackmailed.

The investigation gets complicated when the girlfriend (a prime suspect) is also murdered by the same method.

The police set a trap by putting a chemical on top of the poison, which turns the skin black after a few hours. The player responsible is then spotted whilst playing.

Cast
Leslie Banks as Insp. Anthony Slade
Greta Gynt as Gwen Lee 
Ian McLean as Sgt. Clinton 
Liane Linden as Inga Larson 
Anthony Bushell as John Doyce 
Esmond Knight as Raille 
Brian Worth as Phillip Morring 
Richard Norris as Setchley 
Wyndham Goldie as Kindilett 
Alastair Macintyre as Carter 
E. V. H. Emmett as himself
George Allison as himself

Production
The film stars several Arsenal players and members of staff such as Cliff Bastin and Eddie Hapgood, although only manager George Allison has a speaking part. The Trojans' body doubles on the pitch were players from Brentford, filmed during the First Division fixture between the two sides on 6 May 1939; this was the last match of the 1938–39 season and Arsenal's last official league fixture before the outbreak of the Second World War.
Brentford’s players wore white shirts for the match because their first choice red and white stripes would have clashed with Arsenal's red and white jerseys. The Trojans’ players therefore wore similar white shirts in close up sequences which were then cut in with the match action.

Dickinson planned a follow-up, The Denham Studio Mystery, which was intended to incorporate footage from the abortive film I Claudius, but this fell through.

References

External links

1939 films
1939 mystery films
Arsenal F.C. mass media
British black-and-white films
British mystery films
British detective films
British association football films
Films shot at Denham Film Studios
Films directed by Thorold Dickinson
Films set in London
Films shot in London
Films with screenplays by Patrick Kirwan
Films about murder
1930s English-language films
1930s British films